Chersonese is a name that was given to several different places in ancient times. The word is Latin; it derives from the Greek term for "peninsula", χερσόνησος chersonēsos, from χέρσος chersos ("dry land") + νῆσος nēsos (island). 

It was applied to a number of peninsular localities in the ancient world. These included:

Chersonesos Taurica, ancient Greek colony located in the land of Tauri (today, in the city of Sevastopol, Crimea); also known as Chersonesos Taurica it was referred to the Crimean peninsula
Thracian Chersonese ancient Greek colony located in the land of Thracians (today in Gallipoli); also known as Chersonesus Thracica, ancient name for the Gallipoli Peninsula
Chersonesus Aurea, or Golden Chersonese, ancient name for the Malay Peninsula, described by Ptolemy circa 150 AD
Chersonesus Cimbrica or Cimbrian Chersonese, ancient name for Jutland
Syrian Chersonese, referred to by Plutarch, believed to have been situated in a bend of the Orontes river in the neighbourhood of Antioch
Delmarva Peninsula, referred to by King Charles I of England in the 1632 Charter of Maryland as the "Chersonese"

See also
Chersonesus (disambiguation)

Ancient Greece